Hasan Kılıç (born 27 July 1992) is a Dutch-Turkish professional footballer who plays as a midfielder for Turkish club Pendikspor. He formerly played for FC Den Bosch.

External links
 Hasan Kılıç at Voetbal International 
 

1992 births
Footballers from Utrecht (city)
Dutch people of Turkish descent
Living people
Dutch footballers
Association football midfielders
USV Elinkwijk players
FC Den Bosch players
Samsunspor footballers
Ankaraspor footballers
Denizlispor footballers
Adana Demirspor footballers
Pendikspor footballers
Eerste Divisie players
TFF First League players
Süper Lig players